Damiansville is a village in Clinton County, Illinois, United States. The population was 564 at the 2020 census, up from 491 at the 2010 census.

Geography

Demographics

As of the 2020 census there were 564 people, 205 households, and 152 families residing in the village. The racial makeup of the village was 75.53% White, 0.71% African American, 0.71% Asian, 3.72% from other races, and 19.33% from two or more races. Hispanic or Latino of any race were 20.39% of the population.

There were 205 households, out of which 59.02% had children under the age of 18 living with them, 66.34% were married couples living together, 3.90% had a female householder with no husband present, and 25.85% were non-families. 18.54% of all households were made up of individuals, and 7.80% had someone living alone who was 65 years of age or older. The average household size was 2.82 and the average family size was 2.54.

The village's age distribution consisted of 22.4% under the age of 18, 6.4% from 18 to 24, 35% from 25 to 44, 23.1% from 45 to 64, and 13.1% who were 65 years of age or older. The median age was 33.7 years. For every 100 females, there were 132.9 males. For every 100 females age 18 and over, there were 131.1 males.

The median income for a household in the village was $70,375, and the median income for a family was $71,667. Males had a median income of $39,500 versus $33,000 for females. The per capita income for the village was $34,250. About 0.7% of families and 2.9% of the population were below the poverty line, including 0.0% of those under age 18 and 5.4% of those age 65 or over.

Education
It is in the service area of Central Community High School, formed as a consolidation of the Breese and Aviston high schools in 1971.

References

Villages in Clinton County, Illinois
Villages in Illinois
Populated places established in 1861
1861 establishments in Illinois